Mifflin Township is one of the fifteen townships of Ashland County, Ohio, United States. The 2010 census found 1,126 people in the township, 989 of whom lived in the unincorporated portions of the township.

Geography
Located in the southwestern part of the county, it borders the following townships:
Milton Township - north
Montgomery Township - northeast corner
Vermillion Township - east
Green Township - southeast corner
Monroe Township, Richland County - south
Mifflin Township, Richland County - west
Weller Township, Richland County - northwest corner

The village of Mifflin is located in central Mifflin Township.

Name and history
Mifflin Township was established about 1814. When Ashland County was formed on 24 February 1846, Mifflin Township was partitioned, with original records remaining in the eastern ~1/3 portion of "old" Mifflin Township in the new Ashland County, and the western ~2/3 portion of "new" Mifflin Township remaining in Richland County. 

Statewide, other Mifflin Townships are located in Franklin, Pike, Richland, and Wyandot counties.

Government
The township is governed by a three-member board of trustees, who are elected in November of odd-numbered years to a four-year term beginning on the following January 1. Two are elected in the year after the presidential election and one is elected in the year before it. There is also an elected township fiscal officer, who serves a four-year term beginning on April 1 of the year after the election, which is held in November of the year before the presidential election. Vacancies in the fiscal officership or on the board of trustees are filled by the remaining trustees.

References

External links
County website

Townships in Ashland County, Ohio
1814 establishments in Ohio
Populated places established in 1814
Townships in Ohio